The Last Horse Carriage in Berlin is a 1926 German silent comedy drama film directed by Carl Boese and starring Lupu Pick, Hedwig Wangel, and Maly Delschaft. The film's art direction was by Franz Schroedter. The film premiered in Berlin on 18 March 1926.

Synopsis
A taxi driver in Berlin refuses to give up his horse and switch to motor transport.

Cast
 Lupu Pick as Gottlieb Lüdecke
 Hedwig Wangel as Auguste Lüdecke
 Maly Delschaft as Margot Lüdecke
 Hans Adalbert Schlettow as Erich Flottmann
 Albert Florath as Wilhelm Lemke
 Evi Eva as Anna Lemke
 Werner Pittschau as Karl Lüdecke
 Hugo Fischer-Köppe as Oskar Hempel
 Karl Falkenberg as Strolch

References

Bibliography
 Grange, William. Cultural Chronicle of the Weimar Republic. Scarecrow Press, 2008.

External links

1926 films
1926 comedy-drama films
Films of the Weimar Republic
German silent feature films
German comedy-drama films
Films directed by Carl Boese
Films set in Berlin
Films shot in Berlin
German black-and-white films
UFA GmbH films
Silent comedy-drama films
1920s German films
1920s German-language films